Pistacia lentiscus (also lentisk or mastic) is a dioecious evergreen shrub or small tree native to the Mediterranean Basin.

Description 

The plant is evergreen, from 1 to 5 m high, with a strong smell of resin, growing in dry and rocky areas in North Africa and Mediterranean Europe. It resists mild to heavy frosts but prefers milder winters and grows on all types of soils, and can grow well in limestone areas and even in salty or saline environments, making it more abundant near the sea. It is also found in woodlands, dehesas (almost deforested pasture areas), Kermes oak woods, wooded areas dominated by other oaks, garrigues, maquis shrublands, hills, gorges, canyons, and rocky hillsides of the entire Mediterranean area. It is a typical species of Mediterranean mixed communities which include myrtle, Kermes oak, Mediterranean dwarf palm, buckthorn and sarsaparilla, and serves as protection and food for birds and other fauna in this ecosystem. It is a very hardy pioneer species dispersed by birds. When older, it develops some large trunks and numerous thicker and longer branches. In appropriate areas, when allowed to grow freely and age, it often becomes a tree of up to 7 m. However, logging, grazing, and fires often prevent its development.

The leaves are alternate, leathery, and compound paripinnate (no terminal leaflet) with five or six pairs of deep-green leaflets. It presents very small flowers, the male with five stamens, the female with a 3-part style. The fruit is a drupe, first red and then black when ripe, about 4 mm in diameter. The fruit, although not commonly consumed, is edible and has a tart raisin-like flavour.

Pistacia lentiscus is related to Pistacia terebinthus, with which it hybridizes frequently in contact zones. Pistacia terebinthus is more abundant in the mountains and inland and the mastic is usually found more frequently in areas where the Mediterranean influence of the sea moderates the climate. The mastic tree does not reach the size of the Pistacia terebinthus, but the hybrids are very difficult to distinguish. The mastic has winged stalks to its leaflets, i.e., the stalks are flattened and with side fins, whereas these stems in Pistacia terebinthus are simple. On the west coast of the Mediterranean, Canary Islands and Middle East, it can be confused with P. atlantica.

Distribution
Pistacia lentiscus is native throughout the Mediterranean region, from Morocco and the Iberian peninsula in the west through southern France and Turkey to Iraq and Iran in the east.  It is also native to the Canary Islands.

Ornamental use
In urban areas near the sea, where "palmitos" or Mediterranean dwarf palms grow, and other exotic plants, it is often used in gardens and resorts, because of its strength and attractive appearance. Unlike other species of Pistacia, it retains its leaves throughout the year. It has been introduced as an ornamental shrub in Mexico, where it has naturalized and is often seen primarily in suburban and semiarid areas where the summer rainfall climate, contrary to the Mediterranean, does not affect it.

Resin

The aromatic, ivory-coloured resin, also known as mastic, is harvested as a spice from the cultivated mastic trees grown in the south of the Greek island of Chios in the Aegean Sea, where it is also known by the name "Chios tears". Originally liquid, it is hardened, when the weather turns cold, into drops or patties of hard, brittle, translucent resin. When chewed, the resin softens and becomes a bright white and opaque gum.
The word mastic derives from the Latin word masticare (to chew), in Greek: μαστιχάω verb mastichein ("to gnash the teeth", the English word completely from the Latin masticate) or massein ("to chew").

Within the European Union, mastic production in Chios is granted protected designation of origin and protected geographical indication names. Although the tree is native to all of the Mediterranean region, it will release its resin only on selected places, most notably, around Cesme, Turkey and in the southern portion of the Greek island of Chios, the latter being the only place in the world where it is cultivated regularly. The island's mastic production is controlled by a co-operative of "medieval" villages, collectively known as the 'mastichochoria' (Μαστιχοχώρια, lit. "mastic villages").

Cultivation history
The resin is collected by bleeding the trees from small cuts made in the bark of the main branches, and allowing the sap to drip onto the specially prepared ground below. The harvesting is done during the summer between June and September. After the mastic is collected, it is washed manually and is set aside to dry, away from the sun, as it will start melting again.

 
Mastic resin is a relatively expensive kind of spice; it has been used principally as a chewing gum for at least 2,400 years. The flavour can be described as a strong, slightly smoky, resiny aroma and can be an acquired taste.

Some scholars identify the bakha בכא mentioned in the Bible—as in the Valley of Baca of Psalm 84—with the mastic plant. The word bakha appears to be derived from the Hebrew word for crying or weeping, and is thought to refer to the "tears" of resin secreted by the mastic plant, along with a sad weeping noise which occurs when the plant is walked on and branches are broken. The Valley of Baca is thought to be a valley near Jerusalem that was covered with low mastic shrubbery, much like some hillsides in northern Israel today. In an additional biblical reference, King David receives divine counsel to place himself opposite the Philistines coming up the Valley of Rephaim, southwest of Jerusalem, such that the "sound of walking on the tops of the bakha shrubs" (קול צעדה בראשי הבכאים) signals the moment to attack (II Samuel V: 22–24).

Mastic is known to have been popular in Roman times when children chewed it, and in medieval times, it was highly prized for the sultan's harem both as a breath freshener and for cosmetics.  It was the sultan's privilege to chew mastic, and it was considered to have healing properties.  The spice's use was widened when Chios became part of the Ottoman Empire, and it remains popular in North Africa and the Near East. An unflattering reference to mastic-chewing was made in Shakespeare's Troilus and Cressida (published 1609) when Agamemnon dismisses the views of the cynic and satirist Thersites as graceless productions of "his mastic jaws".

Culinary use
Mastic gum is principally used either as a flavouring or for its gum properties, as in mastic chewing gum.

As a spice, it continues to be used in Greece to flavour spirits and liqueurs (such as Chios's native drink mastiha), chewing gum, and a number of cakes, pastries, spoon sweets, and desserts. Sometimes, it is even used in making cheese. Mastic resin is a key ingredient in dondurma and Turkish puddings, giving those confections their unusual texture and bright whiteness. In Lebanon and Egypt, the spice is used to flavour many dishes, ranging from soups to meats to desserts, while in Morocco, smoke from the resin is used to flavour water. In Turkey, mastic is used as a flavor of Turkish delight.  Recently, a mastic-flavoured fizzy drink has also been launched, called "Mast".

Mastic resin is a key ingredient in Greek festival breads, for example, the sweet bread tsoureki and the traditional New Year's vasilopita. Furthermore, mastic is also essential to myron, the holy oil used for chrismation by the Orthodox Churches.

Mastic continues to be used for its gum and medicinal properties, as well as its culinary uses. Jordanian chewing gum manufacturer, Sharawi Bros., use the mastic of this shrub as a primary ingredient in their mastic-flavoured products and they distribute the gum to many deli stores worldwide. The resin is used as a primary ingredient in the production of cosmetics such as toothpaste, lotions for the hair and skin, and perfumes.

Medicine
People in the Mediterranean region have used mastic as a medicine for gastrointestinal ailments for several thousand years. First-century Greek physician and botanist Dioscorides wrote about the medicinal properties of mastic in his classic treatise De Materia Medica (About Medical Substances). Some centuries later, Markellos Empeirikos and Pavlos Eginitis also noticed the effect of mastic on the digestive system.

Mastic oil has antibacterial and antifungal properties, and as such is widely used in the preparation of ointments for skin disorders and afflictions. It is also used in the manufacture of plasters.

In recent years, university researchers have provided the scientific evidence for the medicinal properties of mastic. A 1985 study by the University of Thessaloniki and by the Meikai University discovered that mastic can reduce bacterial dental plaque in the mouth by 41.5%. A 1998 study by the University of Athens found that mastic oil has antibacterial and antifungal properties. Another 1998 University of Nottingham study claims that mastic can heal peptic ulcers by killing Helicobacter pylori, which causes peptic ulcers, gastritis, and duodenitis. Some in vivo studies have shown that mastic gum has no effect on H. pylori when taken for short periods of time. However, a recent and more extensive study showed that mastic gum reduced H. pylori populations after an insoluble and sticky polymer (poly-β-myrcene) constituent of mastic gum was removed, and if taken for a longer period of time.

Miscellanea
Apart from its medicinal properties and cosmetic and culinary uses, mastic gum is also used in the production of high-grade varnish.

The mastic tree has been introduced into Mexico as an ornamental plant, where it is very prized and fully naturalized.  The trees are grown mainly in suburban areas in semiarid zones, and remain undamaged, although the summer rainfall is contrary to its original Mediterranean climate.

A related species, P. saportae, has been shown by DNA analysis to be a hybrid between maternal P. lentiscus and paternal P. terebinthus (terebinth or turpentine). The hybrid has  imparipinnate leaves, with leaflets semipersistent, subsessile terminal, and sometimes reduced. Usually, P. terebinthus and P. lentiscus occupy different biotopes and barely overlap: Mastic appears at lower elevations and near the sea, while the P. terebinthus most frequently inhabits inland and mountainous areas such as the Iberian System.

"Dufte-Zeichen" (Scents-signs), the fourth scene from Sonntag aus Licht by Karlheinz Stockhausen, is centred around seven scents, each one associated with one day of the week. "Mastix" is assigned to Wednesday and comes third.

See also

 False mastic
 Greek cuisine
 Greek food products
 Mastic (plant resin)
 Mastichochoria
 Turkish cuisine

References

Further reading 

lentiscus
Flora of North Africa
Flora of Western Asia
Trees of Europe
Greek cuisine
Resins
Spices
Chios
Trees of Mediterranean climate
Garden plants of Europe
Garden plants of Africa
Garden plants of Asia
Drought-tolerant trees
Ornamental trees
Plants described in 1753
Taxa named by Carl Linnaeus
Flora of the Mediterranean Basin